1781 in sports describes the year's events in world sport.

Archery
Events
 Foundation of the Toxophilite Society at Leicester Square, London; it later gained royal patronage and became the Royal Toxophilite Society in 1787.

Boxing
Events
 Unknown.

Cricket
Events
 The Hambledon Club abandoned its traditional home at Broadhalfpenny Down after the members decided it was "too remote" and relocated to Windmill Down just outside Hambledon village
England
 Most runs – James Aylward 319
 Most wickets – Lamborn 27

Horse racing
England
 The Derby – Young Eclipse
 The Oaks – Faith
 St Leger Stakes – Serina

References

 
1781